The Central Gauteng women's cricket team, also known as Central Gauteng Lions and previously known as Southern Transvaal women's cricket team, Transvaal women's cricket team and Gauteng women's cricket team, is the women's representative cricket team for part of the South African province of Gauteng. They compete in the Women's Provincial Programme and the CSA Women's Provincial T20 Competition.

History
The side first competed in the Simon Trophy in 1951–52, as Southern Transvaal, competing in the tournament until 1986–87. They then joined the Inter-Provincial Tournament for its inaugural season in 1995–96, as Transvaal, before becoming known as Gauteng in 1997–98. The side became Central Gauteng in 2019–20, and has also been known as Lions, in conjunction with the men's team. They have competed in Provincial One-Day Tournament ever since their first appearance, winning the title once, in 2004–05. That season, they finished second in Group B to qualify for the knockout rounds, subsequently reaching the final where they beat Border by 64 runs. They have also finished as runners-up in the tournament four times: in 2012–13, and three times in a row between 2015–15 and 2017–18.

Central Gauteng have also competed in the CSA Women's Provincial T20 Competition since it began in 2012–13. They have finished as runners-up three times, in 2012–13, 2016–17 and 2021–22, every time to Western Province.

Players

Current squad
Based on squad announced for the 2021–22 season. Players in bold have international caps.

Notable players
Players who have played for Central Gauteng and played internationally are listed below, in order of first international appearance (given in brackets):

  Barbara Cairncross (1960)
  Pamela Hollett (1960)
  Eileen Hurly (1960)
  Jean McNaughton (1960)
  Yvonne van Mentz (1960)
  Lorna Ward (1960)
  Dulcie Wood (1960)
  Bev Brentnall (1966)
  Jos Burley (1966) 
  Lesley Clifford (1966)
  Beverly Botha (1972)
  Carole Gildenhuys (1972)
  Wea Skog (1972)
  Gloria Williamson (1972)
  Myrna Katz (1972)
  Brenda Williams (1972)
  Alta Kotze (1997)
  Kerri Laing (1997)
  Linda Olivier (1997)
  Daleen Terblanche (1997)
  Sunette Viljoen (2000)
  Cri-Zelda Brits (2002)
  Tamara Reeves (2002)
  Trisha Chetty (2007)
  Shabnim Ismail (2007)
  Kirsten Blair (2007)
  Kirstie Thomson (2009)
  Melissa Smook (2011)
  Ayabonga Khaka (2012)
  Savanna Cordes (2013)
  Yolani Fourie (2014)
  Nonkhululeko Thabethe (2014)
  Raisibe Ntozakhe (2017)
  Tumi Sekhukhune (2018)
  Robyn Searle (2018)
  Sharne Mayers (2019)

Honours
 CSA Women's Provincial Programme:
 Winners (1): 2004–05
 CSA Women's Provincial T20 Competition:
 Winners (0):
 Best finish: Runners-up (2012–13, 2016–17 & 2021–22)

See also
 Gauteng (cricket team)

References

Women's cricket teams in South Africa
Cricket teams in Gauteng